Sol Easton Pryce (born 30 January 2000) is an English professional footballer who plays as a forward for Melksham Town.

Club career
After joining local side Swindon Town at the age of fourteen, Pryce signed his first professional contract with Swindon Town in May 2018, after a successful 2017–18 season with the U18 squad. On 7 August 2018, Pryce made his Swindon debut replacing fellow academy graduate, Jordan Young during their 4–0 home defeat against Chelsea U23s in the EFL Trophy.

Pryce scored twice during on his professional league debut in the 3-2 victory against Stevenage at the County Ground in November 2018.

On 31 January 2019, Pryce joined Dulwich Hamlet for the remainder of the 2018-19 season. Following, only two appearances for the club after a month, Pryce's loan was cut short and in turn, joined fellow National League South side, Bath City on a one-month loan.

He was released by Swindon at the end of the 2018–19 season.

Pryce had a spell at Highworth Town before joining Melksham Town in October 2019.

Career statistics

References

External links

2000 births
Living people
English footballers
People from Chippenham
Association football forwards
Swindon Town F.C. players
Dulwich Hamlet F.C. players
Bath City F.C. players
Highworth Town F.C. players
Melksham Town F.C. players
English Football League players
National League (English football) players
Southern Football League players